Vice-Admiral Paul Andrew Maddison,  is a Canadian academic, former diplomat and retired officer of the Royal Canadian Navy. He served as Commander of the Royal Canadian Navy from 22 July 2011 to 21 June 2013. He subsequently served as the High Commissioner of Canada to Australia from August 2015 until May 2019.

Career 
Maddison joined the Canadian Forces in 1975. In 1980, he graduated from Royal Military College Saint-Jean with a Bachelor of Arts. He served on various vessels and in appointments with both the Atlantic and Pacific fleets. In 1991, he deployed to the Persian Gulf with the Canadian Task Group.

From 1994 to 1996, Maddison served as Executive Officer of the frigate . This was followed by his first command, from 1997 to 1999. From 1999 to 2002, he was posted to NORAD headquarters. From 2002 to 2004 he captained the destroyer , a period which included a deployment to the Persian Gulf and Arabian Sea as part of Combined Task Force 151.

In 2005, Maddison's career shifted to National Defence Headquarters in Ottawa, where he became Director General of Maritime Force Development and then Commander of the Standing Contingency Task Force the following year. In 2007 he became Assistant Chief of Military Personnel. In May 2008, Maddison assumed command of the navy's Atlantic fleet, Maritime Forces Atlantic, as well as Joint Task Force Atlantic, the military organization responsible for domestic operations in Atlantic Canada.

In August 2010, Maddison became the Assistant Chief of the Maritime Staff under Vice-Admiral Dean McFadden. Upon McFadden's retirement from the Canadian Forces on July 21, 2011, Maddison became Commander of the Royal Canadian Navy before retiring in 2013.

In June 2015, Maddison was appointed as the High Commissioner of Canada to Australia. He relinquished the post in 2019, and was appointed the inaugural director of the University of New South Wales Defence Research Institute in Canberra, Australia.

Awards and decorations 
Maddison's personal awards and decorations include the following:

Notes

References 

Living people
Commanders of the Order of Military Merit (Canada)
Recipients of the Meritorious Service Decoration
Royal Military College Saint-Jean alumni
Royal Canadian Navy officers
Commanders of the Legion of Merit
Canadian admirals
High Commissioners of Canada to Australia
Year of birth missing (living people)
Commanders of the Royal Canadian Navy